Baiko Pilota —named Asegarce until January 2019— is a Basque event production and deportive license company, mainly devoted to Basque pelota. Through the Bainet company, it has also made audiovisual productions.

History
It was established in 1992 by Karlos Arguiñano and Iñaki Aseguinolaza, among others. Its creation was revolutionary for Basque pelota, giving it a professional structure, and starting the TV transmission of the sport, mainly in the Basque Country, La Rioja and Castilla y León.

In 1993 it took the lead of Eusko – Basque, that had until then exclusive rights on professional jai alai. So, together with the rights it had achieved before, Asegarce had exclusive rights on the categories of hand-pelota, pala (bat) and jai alai.

Sponsored Players

References

External links 
 Official website of Baiko Pilota

Basque pelota
Companies based in Navarre